Eurolot S.A. (previously styled as EuroLOT) was a Polish regional airline based in Warsaw. Apart from its own flights under the eurolot.com brand, it operated short-haul flights for LOT Polish Airlines, as well as ad hoc charter flights. Its main base was Warsaw Frederic Chopin Airport (when operating for LOT), whilst its own flights centre on its hubs at John Paul II Kraków Airport and Gdańsk Lech Wałęsa Airport. The airline had its head office in the LOT Polish Airlines headquarters in Warsaw. Eurolot ended operations on 31 March 2015.

History

Early years 
EuroLOT was established on 19 December 1996 and commenced regular air operations on 1 July 1997. Initially, EuroLOT operated as an air carrier with its own network of connections. At that time EuroLOT's fleet was made up of turboprop aircraft: 5 owned ATR 42-300 and 8 ATR 72-202 leased from LOT together with aircrew. Between 1998 and 2000 EuroLOT also operated two 18-seat BAe Jetstream 31 aircraft. The primary task of EuroLOT was to reconstruct the network of domestic and regional flights while reducing operational costs and to create new value in the field of domestic air transport.

In 2000 the company ceased to be an independent carrier and became an operator. In the same year, EuroLOT took over all ATR aircraft from LOT. In 2002 EuroLOT began to modernize its fleet by replacing ATR 42-300 with newer ATR 42-500. As of March 2007, it had 278 employees.

Later development 
Established as a wholly owned subsidiary of LOT Polish Airlines, its current main shareholder is the State Treasury with 62.1% of shares, while Towarzystwo Finansowe Silesia is the minority shareholder with 37.9% shares. During the 2011 summer season, after the State Treasury acquired the majority of its shares, the airline started flying Polish regional routes under the eurolot.com brand, in addition to operating flights for LOT. Starting in December 2011, Eurolot introduced flights from Gdańsk and Warsaw to Poprad, Slovakia in addition to expanding rapidly in the domestic market.

In 2012, Eurolot placed an order for 8 Bombardier Dash 8 Q400 NextGen turboprop aircraft to replace the old ATR fleet. In 2014 Eurolot considered the wet-lease of a LOT Boeing 787 Dreamliner for services to South East Asia as part of a larger LOT restructuring. However, this plan did not materialise.

On 6 February 2015, it was announced that the company would be liquidated due to financial problems and end operations on 31 March 2015. LOT Polish Airlines assumed some of Eurolot's routes, re-leasing former Eurolot aircraft.

Codeshare agreements
Eurolot had codeshare agreements with the following airlines as of July 2014:

 LOT Polish Airlines

Destinations 

Eurolot served the following destinations as of September 2014:

Fleet 

As of November 2014, the Eurolot fleet consisted of the following aircraft with an average age of 2.3 years for the Q400's:

References

External links

LOT Polish Airlines
Defunct airlines of Poland
Airlines established in 1996
Airlines disestablished in 2015
2015 disestablishments in Poland
Polish companies established in 1996